The George Blackman House is a historic house located at 904 S. Main St. in Hillsboro, Illinois. The house was built in 1842-43 by George Blackman, a local blacksmith and woodworker. Blackman designed his house in a style similar to Southern Creole cottages. Such houses had never before been built in Montgomery County, which historically preferred designs inspired by New England architecture, but Blackman's Southern-inspired features were more appropriate for the local climate. The -story house features a recessed open porch supported by thin columns and is topped by a low roof. The house's open floor plan includes six rooms laid out around a central hall.

The house was added to the National Register of Historic Places on November 6, 1986.

References

Houses completed in 1843
Houses on the National Register of Historic Places in Illinois
Houses in Montgomery County, Illinois
Creole cottage architecture in the United States
1843 establishments in Illinois
National Register of Historic Places in Montgomery County, Illinois